Yonder, formerly named New Knowledge, is a company from Austin, Texas, that specializes in information integrity. It is most widely known for supporting the Senate Select Committee on Intelligence in its investigation of Russian interference in the 2016 US presidential election.  The company was also reportedly involved in a messaging operation during the 2017 US Senate special election in Alabama, though the company denied any political motivation behind its research. More recently, Yonder's CEO and researchers have provided expert commentary to the New York Times, Fast Company, and Axios about 5G and COVID-19 misinformation.

Yonder CEO, Jonathon Morgan, was profiled in HBO's 2020 documentary, After Truth: Disinformation and the Cost of Fake News. The company's former Director of Research was a featured expert in the Netflix documentary The Social Dilemma.

According to the company's marketing material, Yonder now supports both Government and Fortune 100 companies as they try to better understand the influential groups and emerging narratives that impact organizations and discussions of their values. They often share their intelligence with press to inform the public about which groups influence discourse on social media.

Background
Lux Capital and GGV Capital provided $11 million in capital for the company in 2018.

The Hamilton68 database, which tracks disinformation on-line for the US German Marshall Fund's Alliance for Securing Democracy was built by the company.

The company prepared "The Tactics and Tropes of the Internet Research Agency" for the Senate Select Committee on Intelligence.

Two days after this report was published, a New York Times published an article alleging the company's participation in an experiment in the 2017 Senate special election in Alabama. Renée DiResta, one of the principal authors of the Senate report on the Internet Research Agency, said that as she understood it the goal of the New Knowledge research was to investigate how Facebook's content curation algorithms rewarded "sensational news." Facebook responded by suspending the personal accounts of Morgan and four others.

Democratic donor Reid Hoffman donated $750,000 to American Emergent Technologies which provided funding for New Knowledge.  He disavowed any specific knowledge of the project.

Media use
Ruth Reader, writing for Fast Company in April 2020, cited Yonder findings in an article on Anti Vaxxer faction involvement with narratives regarding Vitamin C and a hypothetical COVID-19 treatment saying, "In the past several years, social media has given a soap box to a previously niche group of people who are against vaccination. This group, known colloquially as anti-vaxxers, fabricates stories about the danger of vaccines in attempt to discredit them. Now, the COVID-19 pandemic has given some members of this faction an opportunity to spread more anti-vaccine propaganda, and it's starting to make its way to the mainstream."

Taylor Hatmaker, writing for TechCrunch in April 2020, cited findings in a new Yonder report] in relation to 5G conspiracy theories saying, "A report on coronavirus misinformation from the company notes "the mainstream is unusually accepting of conspiratorial thinking, rumors, alarm, or panic" during uncertain times — a phenomenon that explains the movement of misinformation that we’re seeing now. While the company estimates that it would normally take six to eight months for a "fringe narrative" to make its way from the edges of the internet into the mainstream, that interval looks like three to 14 days in the midst of COVID-19."

In a press release, Yonder described their new product: "Yonder Narrative alerts users when a topic is about to go viral and analyzes how internet subcultures are affecting the narrative, contextualizes the conversation, authenticates which conversations are real and helps users make a decision."

Robert Windrem, writing for NBC News in 2018, cited the company's report on the Internet Research Agency in an article about Green candidate Jill Stein's 2016 campaign. He also cited the company in 2019 to report increased activity on Russian bot-nets surrounding Democrat primary candidate Tulsi Gabbard. Both candidates and media that supported the candidates have been critical of New Knowledge, given reporting about its research project during the 2017 Alabama Senate race.

References

External links

Disinformation
Privately held companies based in Texas
Technology companies established in 2015